Gwladys Lemoussu (born 12 April 1989) is a French paratriathlete. She represented France at the 2016 Summer Paralympics held in Rio de Janeiro, Brazil and she won the bronze medal in the women's PT4 event.

She also competed in the women's PTS5 event at the 2020 Summer Paralympics held in Tokyo, Japan.

References

External links 
 
 
 

Living people
1989 births
Place of birth missing (living people)
French amputees
French female triathletes
Paratriathletes of France
Paratriathletes at the 2016 Summer Paralympics
Paratriathletes at the 2020 Summer Paralympics
Medalists at the 2016 Summer Paralympics
Paralympic bronze medalists for France
Paralympic medalists in paratriathlon